3ivx was an MPEG-4 compliant video codec suite, created by 3ivx Technologies, based in Sydney, Australia. 3ivx video codecs were released from 2001 to 2012, with releases of related technologies continuing until 2015. 3ivx provided plugins to allow the MPEG-4 data stream to be wrapped by the Microsoft ASF and AVI transports, as well as Apple's QuickTime transport. It also allowed the creation of elementary MP4 data streams combined with AAC audio streams. It only supported MPEG-4 Part 2, it did not support H.264 video (MPEG-4 Part 10).

Official decoders and encoders were provided for Microsoft Windows, Mac OS, BeOS, Amiga and Linux. In addition, FFmpeg can decode 3ivx encoded video.

The company was notable for its support of the Haiku OS, providing a port of the 3ivx codec.  The 3ivx port maintainer also produced a QuickTime MOV extractor and an MPEG-4 extractor for Haiku.

3ivx developed an HTTP Live Streaming Client SDK for Windows 8 and Windows 8 Phones for the playback of HLS content on in Windows 8 Modern UI apps.

As of 2019, the 3ivx codec was no longer available for purchase from their website.

See also
 List of codecs

Notes

External links
 3ivx Official site
 3ivx HLS Client SDK for Windows 8 and Windows Phone 8
 3ivx HLS Adapter enables streaming to Windows 8 with current HLS streaming infrastructure
 Interview with Jan Devos at InternetVideoMag.com

Video codecs